Minuscule 678 (in the Gregory-Aland numbering), ε 273 (von Soden), is a Greek minuscule manuscript of the New Testament, on parchment. Palaeographically it has been assigned to the 12th century. The manuscript has complex contents. Scrivener labelled it by 529e.

Description 

A more thorough, accurate description of the manuscript is under preparation (see advance version here). According to the older accounts, the codex contains the text of the four Gospels, on 395 parchment leaves (size ). The text is written in one column per page, 20 lines per page. There is also a division according to the Ammonian Sections (in Mark 233), with references to the Eusebian Canons. It contains the Epistula ad Carpianum, and the Eusebian Canon tables at the beginning. According to Scrivener it is a beautiful copy.

Text 

Kurt Aland did not place the Greek text of the codex in any Category.

It was not examined by using the Claremont Profile Method.

Provenance 

Scrivener and Gregory dated it to the 11th or 12th century. Currently the manuscript is dated by the INTF to the 12th century. It was added to the list of New Testament manuscripts by Scrivener (529) and Gregory (678) and was examined by Dean Burgon.

The manuscript was acquired along with seven other manuscripts (556, 676, 677, 679, 680, 681, and 682) by the late Sir Thomas Phillips, at Middle Hill in Worcestershire. It was housed at the Connecticut Antiqu. R. Barry (Phillipps 3886) in New Haven, Connecticut. It is now owned by Dumbarton Oaks.

See also 

 List of New Testament minuscules
 Biblical manuscript
 Textual criticism

References

Further reading 

Greek New Testament minuscules
12th-century biblical manuscripts